Danzhutou station is a station of Line 3, Shenzhen Metro. It opened on 28 December 2010. It is located in Shenhui Road near Danzhutou Village.

Station layout

Exits

References

External links
 Shenzhen Metro Danzhutou Station (Chinese)
 Shenzhen Metro Danzhutou Station (English)

Shenzhen Metro stations
Railway stations in Guangdong
Longgang District, Shenzhen
Railway stations in China opened in 2010